Furnas Mill Bridge, also known as County Bridge No. 7080, is a historic Pratt through truss located in Blue River Township, Johnson County, Indiana. It was built in 1891 by the King Iron Bridge Co.  The bridge consists of two 120 foot long spans, with a 16 foot wide roadway. The bridge rests on limestone block abutments and a central pier.

It was listed on the National Register of Historic Places in 2001.

References

Road bridges on the National Register of Historic Places in Indiana
Bridges completed in 1891
Transportation buildings and structures in Johnson County, Indiana
National Register of Historic Places in Johnson County, Indiana
Pratt truss bridges in the United States
Metal bridges in the United States